Sand Creek Township is one of eleven townships in Jennings County, Indiana, United States. As of the 2010 census, its population was 872 and it contained 365 housing units.

Geography
The streams of Bear Creek, Fish Creek, Ice Creek, Millstone Creek, Poplar Root Creek and Rock Creek run through this township.

Unincorporated towns
 Brewersville

Adjacent townships
 Jackson Township, Decatur County (north)
 Sand Creek Township, Decatur County (north)
 Columbia Township (east)
 Campbell Township (southeast)
 Center Township (south)
 Geneva Township (west)

Cemeteries
The township contains three cemeteries: Bear Creek, Day and Fish Creek.

Major highways
  Indiana State Road 3

References
 U.S. Board on Geographic Names (GNIS)
 United States Census Bureau cartographic boundary files

External links
 Indiana Township Association
 United Township Association of Indiana

Townships in Jennings County, Indiana
Townships in Indiana